Bhavashankari was a ruler of Bhurishreshtha kingdom of Bengal, who resisted the Lohani Pathan sultans of South Bengal and established hindu sovereignty in her kingdom.

Early life
Bhavashankari was born in a Brahmin family as the eldest daughter of to Dinanath Chaudhuri, a Nayak. Her mother died while giving birth to her younger brother, leaving her at a young age.

Coronation and the Battle of Bashuri 

Bhavashankari returned to the capital early next morning and assumed control of the affairs of the State. In absence of hard evidence, she couldn't try Chaturbhuj Chakravarti and instead demoted him on the pretext of security breach. Raja Bhupati Krishna Ray, the commander of the Pendo fort, was promoted to the post of Sarbadhinayak, the commander-in-chief of the armed forces. Apart from that she took immediate steps to strengthen the army in terms of numbers as well as infrastructure. She herself took the responsibility of their training.

Relationship with Mughals 
Mughal emperor Akbar, who was always wary of a Pathan resurgence in Bengal, decided to strengthen the alliance with Bhurishrestha. He sent Man Singh, the then governor of Bengal to the court of Bhurishrestha as the representative of the Mughal Empire. Man Singh arrived at Garh Bhawanipur with the Mughal seal. In a special ceremony, the charter of alliance was signed between the Kingdom of Bhurishrestha and the Mughal Empire. Through this treaty, the sovereignty of Bhurishrestha was formally accepted by the Mughal empire. The treaty required the former to send a gold coin, a goat and a blanket to the latter as a token of alliance. Maharani Bhavashankari was bestowed with the title of Raybaghini and the Mughals never ever interfered with her Kingdom of Bhurshut.

Legacy
Maharani Bhavashankari became famous by her title Raibaghini, who gradually came to denote a courageous or sometimes rebellious woman and became a part of Bengali proverb. Her story of valour became a part of folklore and were immortalised by ballads and village poets. In February 2012, the West Bengal government inaugurated the annual Raybaghini Rani Bhavashankari Smriti Mela to commemorate her.

References

Bibliography 

Rulers of Bengal
Indian female royalty
Indian women in war
Hindu monarchs